Gamaliel Henry Barstow (July 20, 1784 – March 30, 1865) was a physician, an American politician, a judge, and a U.S. representative for New York.

Biography
Barstow was born in Sharon, Litchfield County, Connecticut. He married Nancy Coryell and they had three children,  Elijah, Mary, and John. He studied medicine in Great Barrington, Massachusetts

Career
In 1812, Barstow moved to Tioga County, and there worked at his father's farm and taught school. Within a year he had become good friends with Judge Coryell (a powerful and influential figure in local politics) and by 1813 had married the Judges' daughter Nancy. He then built the first frame house in the town of Nichols, and opened a store at this location.

Barstow was a member of the New York State Assembly (Tioga Co.) in 1816, 1816-17 and 1818. He was First Judge of the Tioga County Court from 1818 to 1823, and at the same time a member of the New York State Senate (Western D.) from 1819 to 1822, sitting in the 42nd, 43rd, 44th and 45th New York State Legislatures. By 1823, he was ready for a bigger house so he bought a parcel of land and built a magnificent two-story brick New England style home which now, 175 years later, houses the current establishment, The Barstow House Restaurant.  He was again a member of the State Assembly in 1824 and 1827. He was New York State Treasurer from 1825 to 1826. In 1830, he was Town Supervisor of the Town of Nichols.

Elected as an Anti-Mason to the 22nd United States Congress, Barstow was U.S. Representative for the twenty-fifth district of New York from March 4, 1831 to March 3, 1833.

In 1836, he was the Whig candidate for Lieutenant Governor of New York on the ticket with Jesse Buel, but they were defeated by the incumbent Governor Marcy and Lt. Gov. John Tracy. Barstow was again State Treasurer from 1838 to 1839. Afterwards he continued the practice of medicine and engaged in agricultural pursuits in Nichols, New York.

Barstow died on March 30, 1865, in Nichols, Tioga County, New York; and was buried at the Ashbury Cemetery there.

References

External links

The New York Civil List compiled by Franklin Benjamin Hough (pages 35, 201, 206, 257 and 365; Weed, Parsons and Co., 1858) (Google Books)
 

1784 births
1865 deaths
People from Sharon, Connecticut
American people of English descent
New York (state) Democratic-Republicans
Anti-Masonic Party members of the United States House of Representatives from New York (state)
New York (state) Whigs
Members of the New York State Assembly
New York (state) state senators
New York State Treasurers
People from Nichols, New York
New York (state) state court judges
19th-century American judges